Yu Zhong (died 280), courtesy name Shifang, was an official in the state of Eastern Wu during the Three Kingdoms period of China.

Life
Yu Zhong was the fifth son of Yu Fan, an official who served under Sun Quan, the founding emperor of Eastern Wu, and under Sun Quan's predecessor, Sun Ce. His ancestral home was in Yuyao County (餘姚縣), Kuaiji Commandery, which is in present-day Yuyao, Zhejiang. He was known for being trustworthy and reliable. He also recognised the potential in persons such as Lu Ji and Wei Qian (魏遷) when they were still relatively unknown, and was proven right later when they became famous. He was a friend of Wang Qi (王岐), who was also from Yuyao County. They consecutively served as the Administrator of Yidu Commandery (宜都郡; around present-day Yichang, Hubei).

In 280, when forces of the Jin dynasty invaded Wu, Yu Zhong joined the brothers Lu Yan and Lu Jing in defending Wu. They were all killed in battle, after which Wu was conquered by Jin.

Family
Yu Zhong had 10 brothers. Among them, the notable ones were his fourth brother Yu Si, sixth brother Yu Song, and eighth brother Yu Bing.

Yu Zhong married a grandniece of Sun Quan. They had a son, Yu Tan (虞潭), whose courtesy name was Si'ao (思奧). The historical text Jin Yang Qiu (晉陽秋) described Yu Tan as a virtuous and morally upright person who appeared weak on the outside by was actually courageous and resilient on the inside. Yu Tan served in the imperial court of the Jin dynasty and rose through the ranks to the position of General of the Guards (衞將軍). He was allowed to set up his own office and received the same honours as the Three Ducal Ministers. He was posthumously awarded the appointment Palace Attendant and Left Household Counsellor (侍中左光祿大夫).

See also
 Lists of people of the Three Kingdoms

References

 Chen, Shou (3rd century). Records of the Three Kingdoms (Sanguozhi).
 Fang, Xuanling (ed.) (648). Book of Jin (Jin Shu).
 Pei, Songzhi (5th century). Annotations to Records of the Three Kingdoms (Sanguozhi zhu).

Year of birth unknown
280 deaths
Eastern Wu politicians
Eastern Wu generals
Politicians from Ningbo
People from Yuyao
Three Kingdoms people killed in battle